Since 2004 many new Danionins have been discovered which do not yet have scientific names and many other species, previously known only to the scientific fraternity, have become available in Aquarist Shops. This has predictably led to total confusion as to the naming of some fish, with some species having up to five different common names in use and some common names being used for up to four different species.

All common names currently in use for Danionins are listed below in Alphabetical Order. Click on the common name for the correct identity and further details of each fish. The suffix danio is almost always used for common names although the suffix Devario is sometimes in practice used for Danionins in the genus Devario.

Assam danio
Annandale's giant danio
Blood red danio 
Barred danio 
Bengal danio 
Black-barred danio
Blue danio
Blue moon danio
Blue-redstripe danio
Blue ring danio
Burma danio 
Burma zebra danio
Canton danio
Chain danio
China danio
Cheetah danio
Crescendo danio
Dadio
Dwarf danio 
False giant danio
Feegrade danio
Fire bar danio 
Fire ring danio
Fraser's danio
Galaxy rasbora
Giant danio
Glass fish
Glowlight danio
Goldring danio
Gold striped danio
Hikari danio 
Indian flying barb
Indian glass barb
Kakhyen Hills danio
Kedah danio 
Kerr's danio
KP01 danio
Lake Inle danio
Laos giant danio
Leaping barb
Leopard danio
Malayan flying barb
Meghalaya danio 
Magdalena danio 
Mekong flying barb
Mirik red danio 
Moustached danio 
Naga Hills danio
Neon danio
Neon hatchet fish 
Neilgherry Hills giant danio
Northern glowlight danio
Ocelot danio 
Orange finned zebra danio 
Panther danio 
Pearl danio
Putao danio 
Queen danio
Rakhine danio
Rainbow danio
Redfin danio
Redline giant danio
Rocket danio
Rose danio 
Rosy danio
Shan danio
Sharp headed danio
Shillong danio
Sind danio
Sondhi's danio
South Indian flying barb
Spotted danio
Striped flying barb
Sweetlips danio 
Tribal danio 
Turquoise danio
TW01 danio
TW02 danio
TW03 danio 
Vietnamese cardinal minnow
White Cloud Mountain minnow
Yoma danio
Yoma 2 danio 
Zebra danio

See also
 Danionins - Comprehensive guide to Danios, Devarios and associated species.

 List by common name
Fish common names